Events in the year 1496 in Norway.

Incumbents
Monarch: Hans

Events

Arts and literature

Births

Deaths
Alv Knutsson, nobleman and landowner (born c. 1420).

References

Norway